Deividas Gailius (born Deividas Daunys; April 26, 1988) is a Lithuanian professional basketball player for Neptūnas Klaipėda of the Lithuanian Basketball League (LKL).

Professional career
During the 2012–13 season with Neptūnas Klaipėda, Gailius averaged a career high of 17.0 points, 5.6 rebounds and 2.1 assists per game in the Lithuanian League. For the 2013–14 season he played with the Slovenian team Union Olimpija Ljubljana. In 16 EuroCup games played, Gailius averaged  16.1 points, 5.1 rebounds and 1.8 assists per game. In August 2014, he returned to Neptūnas, signing a one-year deal. In June 2015, he signed a two-year deal with Lietuvos rytas Vilnius. The seasons with Rytas were two of the worst in club history, finishing in only 3rd place in the Lithuanian championship, though in 2017, Gailius sealed the win against his former club Neptūnas. In August 2017, he signed a one-year deal with San Pablo Burgos of the Liga ACB.

Gailius spent the 2019–20 season with Neptūnas, averaging 16.6 points and 2.9 assists per game. On September 1, 2020, he signed with Baskets Bonn of the Basketball Bundesliga. In 19 games played for the German side, Gailius averaged 11.1 points, 2.9 rebounds and 1.5 assists per game.

On March 28, 2021, Gailius signed with Neptūnas to return one more time to the club.

International career
Gailius played for Lithuania national team at the 2007 FIBA U-19 World Championship, finishing in 9th place. In 2014 coach Jonas Kazlauskas included Gailius in the preliminary 24-player list for the main Lithuania national basketball team. However, he did not make it into the final roster. In 2015 he was included in the extended candidates list once again. This time, he qualified into the main EuroBasket 2015 roster and won a silver medal. He was invited to the national team training camp in 2016 as well, but was released on July 14.

Euroleague career statistics

|-
| style="text-align:left;"| 2014–15
| style="text-align:left;"| Neptūnas
| 10 || 10 || 26.9 || .470 || .407 || .600 || 4.8 || 2.5 || 1.3 || .0 || 14.7 || 13.9
|- class="sortbottom"
| style="text-align:center;" colspan=2 | Career
| 10 || 10 || 26.9 || .470 || .407 || .600 || 4.8 || 2.5 || 1.3 || .0 || 14.7 || 13.9

Personal life
In the summer of 2007, Gailius changed his surname from Daunys.

References

External links
 Deividas Gailius at eurobasket.com
 Deividas Gailius at euroleague.net
Deividas Gailius at RealGM.com
 Deividas Gailius at basketnews.lt

1988 births
Living people
ABA League players
Basketball players from Klaipėda
BC Neptūnas players
BC Rytas players
BC Šiauliai players
CB Miraflores players
Karşıyaka basketball players
KK Olimpija players
Liga ACB players
Lithuanian expatriate basketball people in Germany
Lithuanian expatriate basketball people in Italy
Lithuanian expatriate basketball people in Spain
Lithuanian expatriate basketball people in Turkey
Lithuanian expatriate basketball people in Slovenia
Lithuanian men's basketball players
Shooting guards
Small forwards
Telekom Baskets Bonn players
Virtus Bologna players